In Unix computing, CTWM (Claude's Tab Window Manager) is a stacking window manager for the X Window System in the twm family of window managers. It was created in 1992 by Claude Lecommandeur from the source code for twm, which he extended to allow for virtual desktops ("workspaces" in CTWM's terminology.)

Features 
Features of the CTWM window manager include:

 Stacking windows
 Written in C
 Support for up to 32 virtual desktops
 Advanced icon management
 Animated icons and backgrounds
 Customizable
 3d titles and borders
 Freely distributable under the MIT License
 Basic EWMH support (as of 4.0.0)
 Backwards-compatibility with twm.
 XPM and JPEG images

References

External links 

Free X window managers
Software using the MIT license